Csillag is a Hungarian surname meaning "star". Notable people with the surname include:

Balázs Csillag (born 1979), Hungarian long-distance runner
Dárius Csillag (born 1995), Hungarian footballer
Endre Csillag (born 1957), Hungarian guitarist
Krisztián Csillag (born 1975), Hungarian footballer
Levente Csillag (born 1973), Hungarian hurdler
Róza Csillag (1832–1892), Hungarian mezzo-soprano
Teréz Csillag (1862–1925), Hungarian actress
Csilla Fodor (born 2001), Hungarian tennis player

See also
Csillag's disease
Csillag fortress — one of the tree fortresses defending Komárno — Komárom from the right bank of Danube — Monostor, Ingmand and Csillag fort (Danube bridgehead)

Hungarian-language surnames